Kelly John Breen (born May 13, 1969, in Perth Amboy, New Jersey) is a trainer of thoroughbred racehorses. Born in Perth Amboy, New Jersey, Breen has been a resident of Howell, New Jersey and Boynton Beach, FL.

As a New Jersey native, he operated a small stable from 1992 to 1994. He then worked as an assistant to Ben Perkins before taking over as the personal trainer at Monmouth Park in 2003. By 2006, he was training horses exclusively for George and Lori Hall.

On June 11, 2011, Breen won the most important race of his career when Ruler on Ice won the third leg of the U.S. Triple Crown series, the Belmont Stakes.

Breen no longer trains privately for the Halls, and has won several graded stakes including those with Bern Identity, Black Onyx, Stonetastic and Calamity Kate.

References

1969 births
Living people
American horse trainers
Sportspeople from Perth Amboy, New Jersey
People from Tinton Falls, New Jersey